The Albany Babies were a Class C league minor league baseball team located in Albany, Georgia.

Notable players
Erskine Mayer, pitcher

Year-by-year record

External links
Albany, Georgia at Baseball-Reference

South Atlantic League (1904–1963) teams
Baseball teams established in 1911
Baseball teams disestablished in 1916
Babies
Professional baseball teams in Georgia (U.S. state)
1911 establishments in Georgia (U.S. state)
1916 disestablishments in Georgia (U.S. state)
Defunct baseball teams in Georgia
Defunct South Atlantic League teams